Duncan Chow (born Duncan Lai (黎登勤), September 19, 1978) is a Hong Kong-born actor who is popular in Taiwan. Chow was originally a professional windsurfer and a fashion show model, but chose acting as a career in 2001. He rose to fame by starring in 2004's Taiwanese Hit Movie "Formula 17", a comedy film about homosexuality.

Early life 
Chow was born in Cheung Chau, Hong Kong. His father, Lai Gun, who is one of the first windies in Hong Kong, taught him windsurfing and also established Cheung Chau Windsurfing Center, a famous destination for many lovers of windsurfing. Duncan is the cousin of former Hong Kong olympian Lee Lai Shan. He was former Hong Kong Windsurfing Team member, won the 1998 Asian Windsurfing Championships.

He began his acting career at the age of 14 as the adolescent version of Bruce Lee in a tribute film called Dragon: The Bruce Lee Story in 1993. His scene appeared at the very beginning of the movie.

At the age of 15, Chow went to New Zealand to study. In an interview, he said that the reason why he choose New Zealand as a place to study abroad was because it was the country of most extreme sports. When Duncan was 18, he returned to Hong Kong in a vacation and went casting with a friend, then he was chosen to shoot a Television advertisement for FedEx. He became a freelance model and appeared in many different TVCs.

Acting career

Chow officially started his professional acting career with the 2000s film "I Do", co-starred with Ella Koon, Bobo Chan, Raymond Wong. After this film, it was rumoured that he had a relationship with Bobo Chan.

In early 2000s, he decided to move to Taiwan to develop his career. He appeared frequently in many Taiwanese TV Dramas. With the success of Formula 17, he gained popular recognition in 2004. One year later, he starred as Mulang in Tsui Hark's film Seven Swords - which was another box office success. In the same year, he played Smiley Dentist in The Shoe Fairy (Mermaid Blossom), co-starred with Vivian Hsu. Duncan was expected to become a new generation idol of Taiwanese Wave. Unfortunately, because of a scandal in late 2005, his career interrupted for several years. In 2009, he came back to Hong Kong to work as interior designer.

In 2012, Chow returned to Taiwan to join in TV series "What is love?" at the age of 34. He said in an interview about the comeback that he really missed acting and would like to take time when he was still young. Luckily, since 2012, many TV dramas in which he appeared have been very successful.

In 2014, CHow starred in Jess Lee's Music Video "Cliff to the Heaven", in which he played a married man who had an affair with his brother's fiancée (played by Xu Naihan). The MV contained a lot of hot scenes between Duncan and Xu Naihan, which made it extremely controversy. This MV has reached over 43 million views on YouTube (April, 2017). This gave Chow to drastically change into a more mature and seductive image.

Chow also returned back to Hong Kong to participate in a Gary Tang television series named "The Hiddens", co-starring many Hong Kong popular actors and actresses (Jessica Hsuan, Lawrence Ng, Michael Tao,  William So).

In 2017, Chow also appeared in another Hong Kong TV Series called "反黑" (OCTB).

Filmography

Film
My Missing Valentine (2020)
High Flash (2018)
Taste of Life (205)
Big Hug (2014)
Shoe Fairy (2006)
Seven Swords (2005)
Formula 17 (2004)
Love Me If You Can (2003)
Leaving in Sorrow (2002)
I Do (2001)
Dragon: The Bruce Lee Story (1993)

Television

Other shows
The Hiddens (TVB, 2016)
 Rock Records in Love (2016)
 Love Cuisine (SETTV, 2015)
 Dear Mom (SETTV, 2014)
 Happy 300 Days (TTV, 2013)
 Falling (PTS, 2013)
 Lady Maid Maid (SETTV, 2012)
 Mameshiba Ichiro Futen no Shiba Jiro (KBS 2012)
 What is love (Supporting role) (2012)
 Medical Examiner Shinomiya Hazuki (TV Tokyo, 2011)
 Hua Yang Shao Nian Shao Nu (CTS / GTV, 2006)
 Hanazakarino Kimitachihe (Guest Star) (2006)
 The Legend of Speed (CTV, 2004)
 Lover of Herb (TVBS-G, 2004)
 Hi! Working Girl (CTV, 2003)

References

External links

 http://blog.sina.com.cn/zhouqunda
 http://www.duncanlai.com
 https://web.archive.org/web/20060503183014/http://ch8c.mediacorptv.com/shows/drama/view/302/1/.html
 https://web.archive.org/web/20091024080621/http://geocities.com/Tokyo/Shrine/2626/dangkan.html
 https://web.archive.org/web/20090810101500/http://duncan.tw.st/
 http://www.twfilm.org/taillyhigh_web/star_5.htm
 
 https://www.facebook.com/TheHiddensHK/

1978 births
Living people
Taiwanese male film actors
Hong Kong windsurfers
Taiwanese male models
Taiwanese male television actors